Shahaf is a common Israeli unisex given name. It is seagull in Hebrew, but it also might mean being free, dreamer, power and love of the sea. It was originally masculine, however, in recent years, the name has been given to girls to support the feminist movement.

As a last name 
 Nahum Shahaf, an Israeli physicist
 Catherine Margaret Shachaf, a biologist and instructor at Stanford University School of Medicine

Other uses 
 Seagull, a sea bird.

References 

Hebrew words and phrases
Masculine given names
Hebrew masculine given names
English masculine given names
Hebrew-language surnames